Carlos Albert Cavagnaro (born 9 April 1946 in Necochea, Buenos Aires) is an Argentine football manager. He became the youngest football manager in the history of the Argentine Primera when he took charge of Argentinos Juniors in 1969 aged 22.

Career

Playing

Cavagnaro was a youth player with Vélez Sársfield in his native Argentina, but suffered an injury that forced him to retire.

Coaching

Cavagnaro has coached ten Argentine teams, including Argentinos Juniors, Vélez Sársfield, Ferro Carril Oeste, Racing Club, Unión de Santa Fe and Platense in the Argentine Primera. He has also worked in Mexico where he was coach of UNAM Pumas and Atlante.

He has also coached many national teams in the CONCACAF region, these include Guatemala (twice), Panama, Grenada, St Kitts and Nevis and El Salvador.

Cavagnaro has also worked in Asia. He became the head coach of the Philippines national team in 1989, and in 2007 he worked as the coach of VB Sports Club of the Maldives.

References

External links 
Curriculum Vitae

Living people
1946 births
Sportspeople from Buenos Aires Province
Argentine football managers
Argentinos Juniors managers
Club Atlético Vélez Sarsfield managers
Ferro Carril Oeste managers
Expatriate football managers in Guatemala
Guatemala national football team managers
Racing Club de Avellaneda managers
Expatriate football managers in Panama
Panama national football team managers
Club Atlético Platense managers
Expatriate football managers in Grenada
Grenada national football team managers
Expatriate football managers in Saint Kitts and Nevis
Saint Kitts and Nevis national football team managers
Chacarita Juniors managers
Expatriate football managers in the Philippines
Philippines national football team managers
Expatriate football managers in El Salvador
El Salvador national football team managers
Defensores de Belgrano managers
Expatriate football managers in the Maldives
Argentine expatriate football managers
Argentine expatriate sportspeople in Grenada
Argentine expatriate sportspeople in the Maldives
Argentine expatriate sportspeople in El Salvador
Argentine expatriate sportspeople in the Philippines
Argentine expatriate sportspeople in Saint Kitts and Nevis
Argentine expatriate sportspeople in Panama
Argentine expatriate sportspeople in Guatemala